Eucalyptus kybeanensis, commonly known as the Kybean mallee ash, is a species of mallee or tree that is endemic to south eastern Australia. It has smooth, white or greyish bark, lance-shaped adult leaves, flower buds in groups of seven, nine or eleven, white flowers and conical or hemispherical fruit.

Description
It has smooth grey or greenish bark, sometimes with insect scribbles and sometimes with a short stocking of rough bark at the base. The flower buds are arranged in leaf axils in groups of seven, nine or eleven on an unbranched peduncle, the individual buds more or less sessile. Flowering occurs between September and December and the flowers are white.

Taxonomy and naming
Eucalyptus kybeanensis was first formally described in 1915 by Joseph Maiden and Richard Cambage from a specimen collected by Cambage on 4 November 1908, and that "grew on sandy conglomerate formation at Kybean, amongst Casuarina nana, Sieber, near the Kydra Trigonometrical Station, on the Great Dividing Range, 4,000 feet above sea-level, sixteen miles easterly from Nimitybelle". The specific epithet (kybeanensis) refers to the locality of Kybean in New South Wales.

Distribution and habitat
Kybean mallee ash grows in exposed positions at high altitude where it is often locally dominant in subalpine mallee scrubs. It occurs south from near Kybean in the far south-west of New South Wales and in the Victorian High Country.

References

Myrtales of Australia
Flora of New South Wales
Flora of Victoria (Australia)
Trees of Australia
Mallees (habit)
Plants described in 1915
Taxa named by Joseph Maiden